Karen Horning (born November 28, 1966) is a former female breaststroke swimmer, who swam for Peru at the 1988 Summer Olympics. 

At the Games, she finished in 28th (100 m breaststroke) and in 24th place (200 m breaststroke), setting the nation record latter (2:37.84). As of late 2009, it still stands as the Peru Record.

References

1966 births
Living people
Peruvian female breaststroke swimmers
Swimmers at the 1987 Pan American Games
Swimmers at the 1988 Summer Olympics
Swimmers at the 1991 Pan American Games
Olympic swimmers of Peru
Pan American Games competitors for Peru
Peruvian people of British descent
20th-century Peruvian women